Davide Drascek (born 23 April 1981) is an Italian footballer who plays as a midfielder.

Drascek was signed by FeralpiSalò on 20 October 2011.

On 11 August 2012 he was suspended for  years due to 2011 Italian football scandal.

References

External links
 Career profile by tuttocalciatori.net

1981 births
Living people
People from Monfalcone
Italian footballers
Serie B players
U.S. Fiorenzuola 1922 S.S. players
Mantova 1911 players
Giulianova Calcio players
L.R. Vicenza players
Venezia F.C. players
Novara F.C. players
Italian people of Slovene descent
L'Aquila Calcio 1927 players

Association football midfielders
Footballers from Friuli Venezia Giulia